Şaban Özdoğan (born 14 March 1990) is a Danish footballer who plays for Ishøj IF as a playing assistant manager. He previously played for Danish Superliga club F.C. Copenhagen.

Biography
Özdoğan started playing youth football at BK Avarta. He moved to Kjøbenhavns Boldklub (KB) in 1999, the reserve team of multiple Danish champions F.C. Copenhagen (FCK). Özdoğan made his debut for F.C. Copenhagen, the defending 2006 Danish Superliga champions, in the unofficial 2006 Viasat Cup tournament in May 2006, after playing the first half of the 2006–07 season in the KB youth team, he was a part of the FCK squad for the Scandinavian Royal League 2006-07 tournament. At new year 2007 he was promoted to the KB senior squad, two years early, alongside Mads Laudrup.

In the summer break 2009, Özdoğan was promoted to the FCK first team squad together with Thomas Delaney, under FCK manager Ståle Solbakken. Özdoğan made his Superliga debut in April 2010, and played two games as FCK won the 2009-10 Danish Superliga championship. In the following season, he played in four games, as FCK won the championship once again. Özdoğan played a total of 70 minutes in these six games for FCK. Under new FCK manager Roland Nilsson, Özdoğan found himself unwanted, and he had his contract annulled in December 2011.

He underwent a trial with Turkish club Kasımpaşa SK, but Özdoğan thought the contract offered was suspicious, and did not sign with the club. He unsuccessfully trialled with Danish 1st Division club Viborg FF, before moving back to childhood club BK Avarta in the Danish 2nd Division for the Spring of 2012. In August 2012, Özdoğan moved to rival 2nd Division club Svebølle B&I.

In the summer 2019 BK Avarta announced, that Özdoğan had left the club and would continue at Ishøj IF as a playing assistant manager.

International career 
He has played 26 games and scored a single goal for various Danish youth national teams. He made his debut for the Danish under-16 national team in January 2006, and played two matches for the team and scored a goal. In September 2006, he was called up for the Danish under-17 national team.

Honours 
Copenhagen
Danish Superliga: 2009–10, 2010–11

References

External links
Danish national team profile

1990 births
Living people
Danish men's footballers
Danish people of Turkish descent
F.C. Copenhagen players
Association football wingers
BK Avarta players
Kjøbenhavns Boldklub players
Danish Superliga players
Ishøj IF players
Denmark Series players
Footballers from Copenhagen
Holbæk B&I players